is a Japanese manga series written and illustrated by Shin Mashiba. It was serialized in Square Enix's shōnen manga magazine Monthly GFantasy from June 2015 to July 2017, with its chapters collected in four tankōbon volumes.

Publication
Square Enix collected its chapters in four tankōbon volumes, released from May 27, 2016, to September 27, 2017.

In North America, the manga was licensed for English release by Seven Seas Entertainment.

Volume list

See also
 Nightmare Inspector: Yumekui Kenbun, another manga series by the same author

References

External links
  
 

Dark fantasy anime and manga
Gangan Comics manga
Seven Seas Entertainment titles
Shōnen manga
Supernatural anime and manga